The BELvue Museum is a museum in central Brussels, Belgium, that focuses on the history of Belgium. It is managed by the King Baudouin Foundation (KBF).

The museum is located in the Hôtel Bellevue, an 18th-century neoclassical hôtel (townhouse) between the / and the Place Royale/Koningsplein, next to the Royal Palace of Brussels. This site is served by Brussels Central Station, as well as by the metro stations Parc/Park (on lines 1 and 5) and Trône/Troon (on lines 2 and 6).

History
In 1977, the Hôtel Bellevue was converted into a museum building, housing a collection from the nearby Royal Museums of Art and History. After 1992, two small museums opened in the building relating to the history of the Belgian monarchy: the Dynasty Museum and the King Baudouin Memorial.

In 2005, the Hôtel Bellevue reopened as a museum devoted to the history of Belgium, presenting a chronological display about the nation's history since 1830.

Museum
Since its opening, the BELvue Museum, managed by the King Baudouin Foundation (KBF), has completely renewed its permanent exhibition. Employing a theme-based approach and with a modern, interactive exhibition layout, the museum offers visitors the keys to understanding Belgium and Belgian society.

Seven social themes are addressed in the rooms: democracy, prosperity, solidarity, pluralism, migration, language and Europe. Each theme is firstly presented from the perspective of the present day, then subsequently developed and explained through the history of Belgium. In the BELvue’s new exhibition, history is not an end in itself, but rather a means to explain and provide the keys to understanding and interpreting our society.

This overview of Belgium's past and present is complemented by a gallery of more than 200 objects. Presented chronologically from the 19th century to today, the pieces embody Belgium’s "physical memory". Visitors will find everyday objects, works of art and design, well-known brands, scientific discoveries, references to great sporting achievements as well as objects that recall the richness of our popular culture.

See also
 Magritte Museum

References

Notes

External links

 Official English-language site of the BELvue Museum
 Official English-language site of the King Baudouin Foundation

Museums in Brussels
History museums in Belgium
2005 establishments in Belgium
Museums established in 2005
City of Brussels
Historiography of Belgium